"Be My Valentine (Lovely Valentine's Day)" is the ninth single by Tommy february6. It was released February 6, 2013 as a Valentine's Day single. The song debuted at number 26 on the Oricon weekly singles chart selling 4,022 copies in its first week.

Track list

Notes
 "Ai no ♥ Ai no Hoshi"  was originally performed by Tommy's band, the brilliant green.

References

External links
 "Be My Valentine" Japanese lyrics
 "Be My Valentine/Love's Star" Romaji lyrics

2013 singles
2013 songs
Tomoko Kawase songs
Warner Music Japan singles
Songs written by Tomoko Kawase